Albany station is an Amtrak intercity rail station in Albany, Oregon, United States. It is served by the Amtrak Cascades and the Coast Starlight passenger trains, and is the westernmost Amtrak station. Albany station also serves as the hub for local transit.

History

The station was constructed in 1909 for the Southern Pacific Railroad and is built of masonry. When Amtrak took over intercity passenger service in May 1971, Albany was dropped as a stop, though a Los Angeles–Seattle train (later the Coast Starlight) was run. Albany was added as a stop on the Coast Starlight on October 30, 1971. 

Beginning in 2004, the station and the surrounding area underwent an $11.3 million restoration that was funded with a combination of federal, state, local, and Amtrak money. The Oregon Department of Transportation was in charge of the project. The station was rededicated on April 18, 2006. The City of Albany also restored the former Railway Express Agency building nearby as offices for the city's transit system.

References

External links

Amtrak Stations Database

Amtrak stations in Oregon
Former Southern Pacific Railroad stations in Oregon
Bus stations in Oregon
Transportation buildings and structures in Linn County, Oregon
Buildings and structures in Albany, Oregon
Railway stations in the United States opened in 1909
1909 establishments in Oregon